On the night of October 2–3, 1941, six Paris synagogues were attacked and damaged by explosive devices places by their doors between 2:05 and 4:05 am. The perpetrators were identified but not arrested.

History 
On the night of October 2–3, 1941, explosive devices were placed in front of six synagogues causing damage to them.

Synagogues affected 

 Synagogue des Tournelles (in the Jewish Marais district)
 Synagogue de la rue Copernic (16th arrondissement of Paris)
 Synagogue Nazareth (3rd arrondissement of Paris)
 Synagogue de la rue Pavée (4th arrondissement of Paris)
 Montmartre Synagogue (18th arrondissement of Paris)

 Grand Synagogue of Paris (9th arrondissement of Paris)

The attacks 
Helmut Knochen, Chief Commandant of the Sicherheitspolizei (Nazi Occupying Security Services) ordered the attacks on the Paris synagogues.

Members of the Milice placed the bombs. At the Synagogue de la rue Copernic, there was partial destruction of the building (the window jamb and the sill were destroyed and the windows were blown out) that the community rebuilt in 1946. In a journal entry dated September 11, 1942, writer Hélène Berr, wrote:

,

The Revolutionary Social Movement (MSR), a Far-right political party was also implicated in the attacks. From research by Patrick Fournie (2016) : 

According to Frédéric Monier (2011): 

Hans Sommer, agent with the Nazi intelligence services in charge of France, contacted Eugène Deloncle in 1941. Sommer provided the materials that Deloncle used in the attacks against the synagogues.

Reporting 
According to the Vichy correspondent of the Swiss newspaper Feuille d'Avis de Neuchâtel et du Vignoble neuchâtelois, on Saturday October 4, 1941:The article continued:

Neither surprise nor emotion 
A police report by the Renseignements généraux dated October 4, 1941, said:

Silence from the Church 
Following the attacks on the Paris synagogues, the Archbishop of Paris Emmanuel Suhard, remained silent. In the Free zone, the Association of French Rabbis expressed surprise at this silence. Several bishops reached out to the rabbis with support, following the example of Cardinal Jules-Géraud Saliège of Toulouse, who wrote a letter of support to Rabbi Moïse Cassorla.

Bibliography 

 .
 .
 Patrick Fournier. La délation des Juifs à Paris pendant l’Occupation, 1940-1944. Université de Paris Ouest Nanterre La Défense.Université d’Ottawa. Thèse en cotutelle internationale pour obtenir les grades de Docteur de l’Université d’Ottawa. Discipline : Histoire. Docteur de l’Université Paris Ouest Nanterre La Défense. Discipline : Science Politique.  Ottawa, Canada, 2016
 
 .

References

See also 

 Paris in World War II
 History of the Jews in France
 Antisemitism in France
 Timeline of Paris
 The Holocaust
 Helmut Knochen
 Eugène Deloncle
 Revolutionary Social Movement

October 1941 events
Synagogues in Paris
Antisemitism in France
The Holocaust in France
Attacks on synagogues and Jewish communal organizations